Oleksandr Semenyuk (born 20 February 1987) is a professional Ukrainian footballer who plays as a striker.

Playing career 
Semenyuk is the product of the FC Bukovyna Chernivtsi and FC Shakhtar Donetsk Sportive School Systems. He began his career at the youth level with FC Shakhtar Donetsk, but only featured in their reserve teams Shakhtar-3 Donetsk in the Ukrainian Second League.

He mainly played in the Ukrainian First League, and Second League with Bukovyna Chernivtsi, PFC Nyva Ternopil, FC Enerhetyk Burshtyn, and Obolon Kyiv. In 2015, he went overseas to Canada to sign with Toronto Atomic FC of the Canadian Soccer League. In his debut season he finished as the club's top goalscorer with 10 goals. In 2020, he signed with FC Vorkuta for the 2020 CSL season.

References

External links

1987 births
Living people
Ukrainian footballers
FC Nyva Ternopil players
FC Bukovyna Chernivtsi players
FC Enerhetyk Burshtyn players
FC Obolon-Brovar Kyiv players
FC Shakhtar-3 Donetsk players
FC Obolon-2 Kyiv players
Toronto Atomic FC players
FC Continentals players
Canadian Soccer League (1998–present) players
Association football forwards
Ukrainian First League players
Ukrainian Second League players
Sportspeople from Chernivtsi